The Bergamo–Brescia railway is a railway line in Lombardy, Italy.

The railway from Bergamo to Brescia was opened between 1854 and 1857 as a part of the original connection between Milan and Venice.

See also 
 List of railway lines in Italy

References

Footnotes

Sources
 
 
  

Railway lines in Lombardy
Railway lines opened in 1854
1854 establishments in the Austrian Empire